This list of Scilla species shows the accepted species names within the genus Scilla, which are predominantly spring perennial plants in the Asparagaceae, (amaryllis) family. The common name is squill, but this has also been applied to a number of taxa not included in Scilla. 

The number of species varies from 30 to about 80, depending on how narrowly or widely the genus is defined. In the narrow circumscription (e.g Speta 1998) a number of species are segregated into eight separate smaller genera. Species of Chionodoxa are often included with Scilla and some classifications list those as a separate section of the genus Scilla (section Chionodoxa) (sec, all other species being included in section Scilla.

List 

, Plants of the World Online accepted the following species: 

Scilla achtenii 
Scilla africana 
Scilla albanica 
Scilla albinerve 
Scilla alinihatiana 
Scilla amoena  – star squill, star hyacinth
Scilla andria 
Scilla antunesii 
Scilla arenaria 
Scilla arsusiana 
Scilla begoniifolia 
Scilla benguellensis 
Scilla berthelotii 
Scilla bifolia  – alpine squill
Scilla bilgineri 
Scilla bithynica  – Bithynian squill
Scilla buekkensis 
Scilla bussei 
Scilla chlorantha 
Scilla ciliata 
Scilla cilicica 
Scilla congesta 
Scilla cretica , syn. Chionodoxa cretica
Scilla cydonia 
Scilla dimartinoi 
Scilla dualaensis 
Scilla engleri 
Scilla flaccidula 
Scilla forbesii , syn. Chionodoxa forbesii
Scilla gabunensis 
Scilla gracillima 
Scilla haemorrhoidalis 
Scilla hildebrandtii 
Scilla huanica 
Scilla hyacinthoides 
Scilla ingridiae 
Scilla jaegeri 
Scilla katendensis 
Scilla kladnii 
Scilla kurdistanica 
Scilla lakusicii 
Scilla latifolia 
Scilla laxiflora 
Scilla ledienii 
Scilla leepii 
Scilla libanotica 
Scilla lilio-hyacinthus  – Pyrenean squill
Scilla litardierei , syn. Chouardia litardierei, Scilla amethystina, Scilla pratensis, Scilla albanica, Scilla italica – amethyst meadow squill, Dalmatian scilla
Scilla lochiae , syn. Chionodoxa lochiae
Scilla longistylosa 
Scilla luciliae , syn. Chionodoxa luciliae
Scilla lucis 
Scilla madeirensis  – Madeiran squill
Scilla melaina 
Scilla merinoi 
Scilla mesopotamica 
Scilla messeniaca 
Scilla mischtschenkoana , syn. Scilla tubergeniana – Tubergen squill
Scilla monanthos 
Scilla monophyllos 
Scilla morrisii 
Scilla nana , syn. Chionodoxa nana
Scilla nivalis 
Scilla oubangluensis 
Scilla paui 
Scilla peruviana  – Portuguese squill, corymbose squill, Cuban lily
Scilla petersii 
Scilla platyphylla 
Scilla pleiophylla 
Scilla pneumonanthe 
Scilla reuteri 
Scilla rosenii 
Scilla sardensis , syn. Chionodoxa sardensis
Scilla schweinfurthii 
Scilla siberica  – Siberian squill
Scilla simiarum 
Scilla sodalicia 
Scilla subnivalis 
Scilla tayloriana 
Scilla textilis 
Scilla uyuiensis 
Scilla vardaria 
Scilla verdickii 
Scilla verna  – spring squill
Scilla villosa 
Scilla vindobonensis 
Scilla voethorum 
Scilla welwitschii 
Scilla werneri

Hybrids 

A hybrid has been named:
Scilla × allenii

Renamed within genus Scilla

 Scilla siehei – glory-of-the-snow: see Scilla forbesii

Formerly included 

The common bluebell of British and European bluebell woods, still occasionally referred to by a former name, Scilla non-scripta, is now known as Hyacinthoides non-scripta. Several African species previously classified in Scilla have been removed to the genus Ledebouria. The best known of these is the common houseplant still sometimes known as Scilla violacea but now properly Ledebouria socialis.

 Scilla autumnalis – autumn squill: see Prospero autumnale
 Scilla maritima – sea squill: see Drimia maritima
 Scilla nutans – common bluebell: see Hyacinthoides non-scripta

References

Bibliography 

 

Scilla